Irina Baskakova (born August 25, 1956) is a retired track and field sprinter from the Soviet Union, known for winning the bronze medal in the women's 4x400 metres relay at the 1982 European Championships. She did so alongside Irina Olkhovnikova, Olga Mineyeva and Yelena Didilenko, clocking a total time of 3:22.79.

A year later Baskakova repeated that feat at the inaugural World Championships, this time with Marina Ivanova-Kharlamova, Yelena Korban, and Mariya Kulchunova-Pinigina.

References

1956 births
Living people
Soviet female sprinters
Russian female sprinters
Place of birth missing (living people)
World Athletics Championships medalists
European Athletics Championships medalists
Universiade medalists in athletics (track and field)
Universiade gold medalists for the Soviet Union
Medalists at the 1981 Summer Universiade
Friendship Games medalists in athletics